Kilkis is one of the regional units of Greece, in the geographic region of Macedonia. It is part of the region of Central Macedonia. Its capital is the city of Kilkis.

Geography
The geography of the regional unit of Kilkis is characterized by the wide and flat Axios river valley in the westcentral part, and mountain ranges on its western and northeastern edges. The mountain range in the west, on the border with Pella regional unit, is Mount Paiko (highest peak ). In the north, the Kerkini range straddles the border with North Macedonia. At  the highest peak in Kilkis regional unit is located here. The border with Serres regional unit to the northeast is formed by the lower Kroussia range (highest peak ). Lake Doirani is situated in the north, shared with North Macedonia. Kilkis borders the Thessaloniki regional unit to the south.

The climate of the Kilkis regional unit is humid continental in the north, and humid subtropical in the lower regions.

History

The area of the modern regional unit was part of the Kingdom of Macedonia from the 8th century BC until the Third Macedonian War (171 BC - 168 BC), when it became a part of the Roman Empire. At the division of the Roman Empire in 395 AD, the area joined the eastern part, later known as the Byzantine Empire. Between the 7th century and the 11th century, it changed hands between the Byzantine Empire and the Bulgarian Empire repeatedly. In the 13th and 14th century Western Europeans and Serbs briefly ruled the area. The Ottoman Empire conquered the area in 1371, and ruled it until the First Balkan War of 1912. In the Second Balkan War of 1913, the Greek army captured the area, which became part of Greece. It absorbed many of the Greeks from what is now the Republic of North Macedonia, especially from Gevgeli, Vogdantsa, Polyane and Stromnitsa.

In the aftermath of the Balkan Wars, World War I and the Greco-Turkish War (1919-1922) most of the Turkish and Bulgarian population of Kilkis emigrated, and many Greeks from Bulgaria, North Macedonia and Turkey settled in the area, as prescribed by the Treaty of Lausanne (1923). In fact, a very large segment of the population of Kilkis regional unit are in origin Caucasus Greeks (that is, Eastern Pontic Greeks) from the former Russian Imperial province of Kars Oblast in the South Caucasus. They left their homeland in the South Caucasus for Kilkis and other parts of Greek Macedonia, as well as southern Russia and Georgia, between 1919 and 1921, that is, between the main Greece-Turkey population exchange and Russia's cession of the Kars region back to Turkey as part of the Treaty of Brest Litovsk.

Until 1939, when created into a separate prefecture, the area was part of the Thessaloniki Prefecture. At the 2011 Kallikratis reform, the Kilkis Prefecture became a regional unit.

Sites of interest 
 Archaeological Museum of Kilkis
 Saint George's Cave in Kilkis
 Folklore Museum of Goumenissa
 Giapatzis' Medieval Watermill in Goumenissa
 Natural History Museum in Axioupoli
 Kilkis War Museum
 World War I museum in Skra, dedicated to the Battle of Skra-di-Legen
 Galazia limni (blue lagoon) with waterfalls, near Koupa
 Metalliou lake, near Pigi, Kilkis
 The picturesque villages of Paiko with Macedonian architecture, Goumenissa, Griva, Kastaneri and Karpi
 The mountainous massif of Kroussia
 The mountainous massif of Paiko
 The mountainous massif of Kerkini (Beles)
 Chilia Dentra (A Thousand Trees) in Mouries, a perennial forest of oaks and ash trees beside Doirani lake
 Doirani village, with fish taverns near lakeshore
 The archaeological site of ancient Ioron near Palatiano
 The archaeological site of Evropos
 The Monastery of Saints Rafael, Nicolaos and Irene, near Griva
 The Monastery of Nicodemus the Hagiorite, near Pentalofos
Lake Pikrolimni, Natura 2000 protected wetland and location of spa for balneotherapy and pelotherapy

Transport

The Motorway 1 (E75, Skopje - Polykastro - Thessaloniki - Athens) runs through the regional unit from north to south. Two railways pass through the regional unit: from Thessaloniki to Skopje via Polykastro and Idomeni, and from Thessaloniki to Sofia, Istanbul and Alexandroupoli via Kilkis and Mouries.

Administration

The regional unit Kilkis is subdivided into 2 municipalities. These are (number as in the map in the infobox):
Paionia (2)
Kilkis (1)

Prefecture

As a part of the 2011 Kallikratis government reform, the former Kilkis Prefecture was transformed into a regional unit within the Central Macedonia region, without any change in boundaries. At the same time, the municipalities were reorganised, according to the table below.

Provinces

The former prefecture of Kilkis was subdivided into the following provinces:

Note: Provinces no longer hold any legal status in Greece.

See also
List of settlements in the Kilkis regional unit

References

External links
Municipality of Kilkis
Prefecture of Kilkis
History of the Greek Army at the Battle of Kilkis

 
Prefectures of Greece
Regional units of Central Macedonia